Winkel is a Dutch and Low German toponymic surname. While winkel means shop in modern Dutch, its original meaning was "corner" or "enclosed piece of land", and the surname is thought to be toponymic only. Among multiple places named (de/'t) Winkel, Winkel, North Holland is known to be at the origin of several families with the name. Variant forms include De Winkel, Te Winkel, Van Winkel, Van de Winkel, Winckel, and Winkels. People with these surnames include:

Adrian P. Winkel (1915–1994), American politician, High Commissioner of the Trust Territory of the Pacific Islands
Ashley van Winkel (fl. 1996), South African lawn bowler
Cees Jan Winkel (born 1962), Dutch freestyle swimmer
Corrie Winkel (born 1944), Dutch backstroke swimmer
Dietrich Nikolaus Winkel (1777–1826), German-born Dutch inventor of the metronome
Frederik Winkel-Horn (1756–1837), Danish writer
Frederik Winkel Horn (1845–1898), Danish historian and translator
Gary Winkel (born 1938), American environmental psychologist
 (1847–1927), Dutch linguist and philologist, unrelated to Lambert
Joanna van de Winkel (born 1982), South African road bicycle racer
 (1809–1868), Dutch linguist and lexicographer, unrelated to Jan
 (1885–1981), German architect
Mogens Winkel Holm (1936–1999), Danish composer
Nate Winkel (born 1978), American soccer midfielder
Paul van Winkel (born 1953), Belgian wheelchair racer
Petrus Wijtse Winkel (1909–2012), Dutch colonial administrator in the Dutch East Indies
Rick Winkel (born 1956), American (Illinois) politician and lawyer
Therese Winkel ( (1784 – 1867) German author, composer, and harpist
Torsten de Winkel (born 1965),  German musician, composer, and philosopher 
Winckel
Franz von Winckel (1837–1911), German gynecologist and obstetrician
Gus Winckel (1912–2013), Dutch military officer and pilot
Jan Van Winckel (born 1974), Belgian football coach

See also
Van Winkle, Anglicized form of the surname "Van Winkel"

References

Dutch-language surnames
Dutch toponymic surnames
German toponymic surnames